In logic and mathematics, the logical biconditional, sometimes known as the material biconditional, is the logical connective used to conjoin two statements  and  to form the statement " if and only if ", where  is known as the antecedent, and  the consequent. This is often abbreviated as " iff ". Other ways of denoting this operator may be seen occasionally, as a double-headed arrow (↔ or ⇔ may be represented in Unicode in various ways), a prefixed E "Epq" (in Łukasiewicz notation or Bocheński notation), an equality sign (=), an equivalence sign (≡), or EQV.

Semantically, the only case where a logical biconditional is different from a material conditional is the case where the hypothesis is false but the conclusion is true. In this case, the result is true for the conditional, but false for the biconditional.

In the conceptual interpretation,  means "All 's are 's and all 's are 's". In other words, the sets  and  coincide: they are identical. However, this does not mean that  and  need to have the same meaning (e.g.,  could be "equiangular trilateral" and  could be "equilateral triangle"). When phrased as a sentence, the antecedent is the subject and the consequent is the predicate of a universal affirmative proposition (e.g., in the phrase "all men are mortal", "men" is the subject and "mortal" is the predicate).

In the propositional interpretation,  means that  implies  and  implies ; in other words, the propositions are logically equivalent, in the sense that both are either jointly true or jointly false. Again, this does not mean that they need to have the same meaning, as  could be "the triangle ABC has two equal sides" and  could be "the triangle ABC has two equal angles". In general, the antecedent is the premise, or the cause, and the consequent is the consequence. When an implication is translated by a hypothetical (or conditional) judgment, the antecedent is called the hypothesis (or the condition) and the consequent is called the thesis.

A common way of demonstrating a biconditional of the form  is to demonstrate that  and  separately (due to its equivalence to the conjunction of the two converse conditionals).

When both members of the biconditional are propositions, it can be separated into two conditionals, of which one is called a theorem and the other its reciprocal. Thus whenever a theorem and its reciprocal are true, we have a biconditional. A simple theorem gives rise to an implication, whose antecedent is the hypothesis and whose consequent is the thesis of the theorem.

It is often said that the hypothesis is the sufficient condition of the thesis, and that the thesis is the necessary condition of the hypothesis. That is, it is sufficient that the hypothesis be true for the thesis to be true, while it is necessary that the thesis be true if the hypothesis were true. When a theorem and its reciprocal are true, its hypothesis is said to be the necessary and sufficient condition of the thesis. That is, the hypothesis is both the cause and the consequence of the thesis at the same time.

Definition

Logical equality (also known as biconditional) is an operation on two logical values, typically the values of two propositions, that produces a value of true if and only if both operands are false or both operands are true.

Truth table

When more than two statements are involved, combining them with  might be ambiguous. For example, the statement

may be interpreted as

,

or may be interpreted as saying that all  are jointly true or jointly false:

As it turns out, these two statements are only the same when zero or two arguments are involved. In fact, the following truth tables only show the same bit pattern in the line with no argument and in the lines with two arguments:

The left Venn diagram below, and the lines (AB    ) in these matrices represent the same operation.

Venn diagrams

Properties
Commutativity: Yes

Associativity: Yes

Distributivity:  Biconditional doesn't distribute over any binary function (not even itself), but logical disjunction distributes over biconditional.

Idempotency: No

Monotonicity: No

Truth-preserving: Yes
When all inputs are true, the output is true.

Falsehood-preserving: No
When all inputs are false, the output is not false.

Walsh spectrum: (2,0,0,2)

Nonlinearity: 0 (the function is linear)

Rules of inference

Like all connectives in first-order logic, the biconditional has rules of inference that govern its use in formal proofs.

Biconditional introduction

Biconditional introduction allows one to infer that if B follows from A and A follows from B, then A if and only if B.

For example, from the statements "if I'm breathing, then I'm alive" and "if I'm alive, then I'm breathing", it can be inferred that "I'm breathing if and only if I'm alive" or equivalently, "I'm alive if and only if I'm breathing." Or more schematically:

  B → A   
  A → B   
  ∴ A ↔ B

  B → A   
  A → B   
  ∴ B ↔ A

Biconditional elimination
Biconditional elimination allows one to infer a conditional from a biconditional: if A ↔ B is true, then one may infer either A → B, or B → A.

For example, if it is true that I'm breathing if and only if I'm alive, then it's true that if I'm breathing, then I'm alive; likewise, it's true that if I'm alive, then I'm breathing. Or more schematically:

  A ↔ B  
  ∴ A → B

  A ↔ B  
  ∴ B → A

Colloquial usage

One unambiguous way of stating a biconditional in plain English is to adopt the form "b if a and a if b"—if the standard form "a if and only if b" is not used. Slightly more formally, one could also say that "b implies a and a implies b", or "a is necessary and sufficient for b". The plain English "if'" may sometimes be used as a biconditional (especially in the context of a mathematical definition). In which case, one must take into consideration the surrounding context when interpreting these words.

For example, the statement "I'll buy you a new wallet if you need one" may be interpreted as a biconditional, since the speaker doesn't intend a valid outcome to be buying the wallet whether or not the wallet is needed (as in a conditional). However, "it is cloudy if it is raining" is generally not meant as a biconditional, since it can still be cloudy even if it is not raining.

See also

 If and only if
 Logical equivalence
 Logical equality
 XNOR gate
 Biconditional elimination
 Biconditional introduction

References

External links
 

Biconditional
Equivalence (mathematics)